Neogonodactylus is a genus of mantis shrimp. It contains the following species:

 Neogonodactylus albicinctus (Manning & Reaka, 1979)
 Neogonodactylus austrinus (Manning, 1969)
 Neogonodactylus bahiahondensis (Schmitt, 1940)
 Neogonodactylus bredini (Manning, 1969)
 Neogonodactylus campi Manning, 1997
 Neogonodactylus caribbaeus (Schotte & Manning, 1993)
 Neogonodactylus costaricensis (Manning & Reaka, 1979)
 Neogonodactylus curacaoensis (Schmitt, 1924)
 Neogonodactylus festae (Nobili, 1901)
 Neogonodactylus lacunatus (Manning, 1966)
 Neogonodactylus lalibertadensis (Schmitt, 1940)
 Neogonodactylus lightbourni (Manning & Hart, 1981)
 Neogonodactylus minutus (Manning, 1969)
 Neogonodactylus moraisi (Fausto-Filho & Lemos de Castro, 1973)
 Neogonodactylus oerstedii (Hansen, 1895)
 Neogonodactylus petilus (Manning, 1970)
 Neogonodactylus pumilus (Manning, 1970)
 Neogonodactylus spinulosus (Schmitt, 1924)
 Neogonodactylus stanschi (Schmitt, 1940)
 Neogonodactylus torus (Manning, 1969)
 Neogonodactylus wennerae Manning & Heard, 1997
 Neogonodactylus zacae (Manning, 1972)

References

Stomatopoda
Taxa named by Raymond B. Manning